Atylidae is a family of amphipod crustaceans, containing the following genera:
Anatylus Bulycheva, 1955
Kamehatylus J. L. Barnard, 1970
Austroniphargus Monod, 1925
Sandro Karaman & Barnard, 1979
Atylus Leach, 1815
Lepechinella Stebbing, 1908
Lepechinelloides Thurston, 1980
Lepechinellopsis Ledoyer, 1983
Paralepechinella Pirlot, 1933
Aberratylus Bousfield & Kendall, 1994
Nototropis Costa, 1853

References

Gammaridea
Taxa named by Wilhelm Lilljeborg
Crustacean families